Pátek is a municipality and village in Nymburk District in the Central Bohemian Region of the Czech Republic. It has about 700 inhabitants.

Etymology
The name literally means "Friday". The village was probably founded on Friday.

Geography
It lies in a flat agricultural landscape in the Central Elbe Table. The Sánský Channel flows through the municipality. There are several small ponds.

History
The first written mention of Pátek is from 1345.

Sights
The most valuable building is a watermill from 1820. It was functional until 1952. Today the building is unused.

The Church of Saint Lawrence is a cemetery church without historic value. The original wooden church was built in 1350–1354. At the turn of the 15th and 16th centuries, it was replaced by a stone one. Around 1711, the church was probably struck by lightning and fell into disrepair. In 1854, it was completely rebuilt to its present form.

References

External links

Villages in Nymburk District